Man, Economy, and State: A treatise on economic principles is a 1962 book of Austrian School economics by Murray Rothbard (orig. abridged ed.).

According to Joseph T. Salerno's Introduction to the work, Rothbard's "primary mission" in writing it was "to purge modern economic science of its alien positivist and mathematical formalist elements and to reconstruct it along consistently causal-realist lines." According to Robert P. Murphy, the book had an "obvious role in the modern revival of Austrian ideas", and "still holds up". According to Ludwig von Mises, the book "offers to every intelligent man an opportunity to obtain reliable information concerning the great controversies and conflicts of our age." 

According to Salerno, the book Power and Market "was originally written as the third volume of Man, Economy, and State, but was published separately eight years later", which is why the two books are now published in the same volume by the Mises Institute.

Summary 

Rothbard's own Preface to the work summarizes its contents by saying that it "deduces the entire corpus of economics from a few simple and apodictically true axioms: the Fundamental Axiom of action—that men employ means to achieve ends, and two subsidiary postulates: that there is a variety of human and natural resources, and that leisure is a consumers' good." 

Chapter 1, "Fundamentals of Human Action", discusses the concept of action, which is purposeful behavior. The social scientist, including the economist, imputes subjective intentions to the objects of study, which are acting human beings. Praxeology is the scientific study of action and consists of all propositions logically derived from the action axiom. Only individuals can act, and a person will act only if they desire a particular state of affairs and believe they have the capacity to bring it about. Man uses means to achieve his ends, and all action takes place in time. Acting man must rank possible ends in order of desirability and allocate the means to fulfill his most highly ranked ends, but he may err due to uncertainty. The means to satisfy wants are goods, which can be consumers' goods or producers' goods. The original factors of production are labor and land, and the value of producers' goods derives from the value that acting man places on the final consumers' goods they produce. The period of production is the time elapsing from the beginning of an action until the end is achieved, which includes working time and maturing time.

Chapter 2, "Direct Exchange", describes interpersonal action and voluntary exchange, which is the assumption made throughout the rest of the book. In voluntary exchange, individuals only engage in a trade if they have a reverse valuation of the goods and if they are aware of each other. This exchange leads to specialization and the division of labor, allowing for more consumption for everyone involved. The price of a good in terms of another is determined by the number of units of the second good that must be offered to receive one unit of the first good in exchange. The equilibrium price is one in which the quantity supplied equals the quantity demanded, and the market tends toward this equilibrium.

Chapter 3, "The Pattern of Indirect Exchange", discusses the limitations of direct exchange, which is exchanging goods directly with another party. Direct exchange can be limited since it requires a coincidence of wants between two parties. If someone wishes to specialize in one area of production, they need to be sure they can find someone who wants their goods at that time. The emergence of indirect exchange increases the flexibility of individuals by allowing them to trade goods for other goods that are more marketable. Over time, the most marketable goods become commonly accepted media of exchange, or money. The use of money enables specialization and economic calculation. As money emerges on a free market, it is traded in terms of weight.

Chapter 4, "Prices and Consumption", begins by explaining how the introduction of a money commodity simplifies transactions as it serves as a medium of exchange. Money prices are generated by the actions of individuals, and must ultimately be explained by reference to individual value scales. Each individual in the market ranks various units of each commodity, including the money commodity, on an ordinal scale of value. The determination of the market supply schedule is also comparable to the barter analysis. The equilibrium price is the price at which quantity supplied equals quantity demanded. All participants to voluntary exchange benefit, and each values what they receive more than what they give up. The marginal utility of money depends largely on the marginal utility of the various goods for which it can be exchanged. To explain the current purchasing power of money, we must explain why people sacrifice valuable goods and services today for units of money, i.e., we need to regress the current value of money back to the original value assigned to it before it became a medium of exchange.

Chapter 5, "Production: the Structure", reviews some of the fundamental principles of action. It explores the concept of the evenly rotating economy (ERE), which is a mental construction of a perfectly predictable economy with no uncertainty, no profits, and only interest based on time preference. Then, it examines the structure of production in a hypothetical world where each good is produced by several completely specific factors and analyzes the distribution of income among the various complementary factors in two cases: joint ownership of the product by the owners of the factors and ownership of the product by capitalists. It concludes that the excess of income earned by capitalists over the sum of payments made to the original factor owners is due to interest and not exploitation or bargaining power. The text also explains the concept of the pure rate of interest and its determination in the ERE.

Chapter 6, "Production: the Rate of Interest and Its Determination", focuses on the pure rate of interest and its determination in the market, taking into account the production structure in a capitalist economy. The pure rate of interest is the premium on present goods that exists in the economy and is determined by subjective time preferences. The capitalists in the production process receive interest income at the intermediate points and not just at the end of the process, and this income is due to their advance payments to factor owners in exchange for future consumer goods. The capitalists decide every period to repeat their gross investments to maintain a production process, and the profitability of a given operation is determined by price spreads and their relation to the prevailing rate of time preference. An individual's marginal rate of time preference depends on their cash balance, both in the present and expected in the future. There is a potential gain from intertemporal trade, and the pure rate of interest will be established by the various individuals' time preferences in the same way that any other price is established.

Chapter 7, "Production: General Pricing of the Factors", explains how prices for unit factor services are determined in the evenly rotating economy (ERE). Capitalists will hire additional productive resources as long as the rental price is lower than the discounted marginal value product (DMVP), which is the present market value of the future marginal value product (MVP). The MVP is determined by the marginal physical product (MPP) times the price of the product, and factors are classified as land, labor, or capital goods based on reproducibility. In the ERE, all productive assets have a capitalized value, so the only incomes are labor and interest on invested financial capital. Even the rental income from land is considered an implicit return on capital investment, as the market value of the land reflects its future rental payments.

Chapter 8, "Production: Entrepreneurship and Change", discusses entrepreneurial profit and loss, the role of entrepreneurship in establishing correct factor prices, and the effects of changes in time preferences on investment and interest rates. A progressing economy is characterized by net aggregate profits and falling interest rates, while a retrogressing economy is characterized by net disinvestment and rising interest rates. The actual market rate of interest is influenced not only by pure interest but also by the likelihood of default or poor returns. Risk refers to outcomes with quantifiable probabilities.

Chapter 9, "Production: Particular Factor Prices and Productive Incomes", discusses factor prices and their determination in a changing economy. The chapter explains that rent is the price paid for hiring a unit of a factor and is equal to the present discounted value of its future rents. In the ERE, only land and labor factors earn net rents. The chapter also discusses the supply curves for land and labor and how they can be upward sloping due to alternative outlets. Additionally, the chapter explains that prices determine costs, not vice versa, and that the rental prices of factors are determined by computing the DMVP of a productive factor. Finally, the chapter explains how consumer valuations determine the marginal utility of consumer goods, which ultimately determine the prices of these goods.

Chapter 10, "Monopoly and Competition", argues that consumer preferences drive a free market economy and that individuals have complete control over their bodies and other property. The formation of cartels is similar to the founding of a corporation or merger, and voluntary cartels are inherently unstable. There is no such thing as a "monopoly price," and the concept of a "perfectly competitive" industry is flawed. Unions restrict output and achieve higher prices, but they are not an example of monopoly. The argument for unions based on zones of indeterminacy shrinks as more people enter the market, and in practice, they often rely on violence to achieve their goals.

Chapter 11, "Money and Its Purchasing Power", explains that the price of money is determined by supply and demand, and its "price" is the vector of its exchange ratios with other goods and services. The purchasing power of money (PPM) is its price, and it is determined by the demand for money. Money is only useful insofar as it possesses purchasing power, but any stock of money can fully function as a medium of exchange. Money would become unnecessary in a world of perfect certainty. The PPM and the rate of interest are not inherently connected. Money is not a measure of value, and price indices are arbitrary. Attempts to stabilize the PPM are undesirable and unworkable.

Chapter 12, "The Economics of Violent Intervention in the Market", highlights the effects of State action on property rights and the economy. Different types of intervention are analyzed, such as autistic, binary, and triangular intervention. The free market maximizes ex ante utilities and has mechanisms to promote ex post fulfillment, while government intervention harms at least one party and distorts the economy. Price controls lead to shortages or surpluses, taxation and government spending distort the economy, and a credit expansion creates a temporary "boom" period followed by a "bust" when the capital structure becomes unbalanced. The chapter challenges the myth that taxes on a firm can be "passed on" to customers and argues that economists should gauge the value of government activities by how much customers spend on products rather than by how much the government spends on them.

Publishing history 

English
 
 
 
 

Japanese
 

Czech
 

Polish
 

Portuguese

Notes

References

External links
 Combined, complete text of 
 
 Complete text of Portuguese translated version 

1962 non-fiction books
2004 non-fiction books
Books about capitalism
Books by Murray Rothbard
Treatises